Edgardo Daniel Orzuza Cáceres (born 22 June 1990) is a Paraguayan international footballer who plays for Club Olimpia as a midfielder.

Career
Born in Paraguarí, Orzuza has played club football for Sol de América and Club Nacional.

He made his international debut for Paraguay in 2012.

References

1990 births
Living people
Paraguayan footballers
Paraguayan expatriate footballers
Paraguay international footballers
Association football midfielders
Club Sol de América footballers
Club Nacional footballers
Associação Chapecoense de Futebol players
Club Olimpia footballers
Campeonato Brasileiro Série A players
Paraguayan Primera División players
Paraguayan expatriate sportspeople in Brazil
Expatriate footballers in Brazil